Day for Night is the fourth studio album by American progressive rock band Spock's Beard released on March 23, 1999.

The multi-part epic "The Healing Colors of Sound" comprises tracks 8 through 13 on the album.

A CD single promoting the track "Skin" was subsequently released as well.
The single contained 3 additional tracks: An edited version of "The Healing Colors of Sound", "Can't Get It Wrong", and also the Neal Morse track "Lost Cause", taken from his self-titled debut solo album.

Track listing

European edition bonus track
 "Hurt" – 3:08

Japanese edition bonus track
 "Urban Noise" – 0:40
 "June" – 6:11

Personnel
Neal Morse – lead vocals, piano, all synths, acoustic guitar
Alan Morse – electric guitar, Mellotron, vocals
Dave Meros – bass, vocals
Nick D'Virgilio –  drums, percussion, vocals
Ryo Okumoto – Hammond organ, Mellotron

Additional musicians
John Garr - Saxophone (5)
Joy Worland - French horn (7-8)
Eric Brenton, Tom Tally, John Krovoza - string section (8)
Byron House - string bass and cello (2,7)

Technical personnel
 Rich Mouser - mixing

References

Spock's Beard albums
1999 albums
Metal Blade Records albums